Hans Johnstone (born 29 May 1961) is an American former Nordic combined skier who competed in the 1988 Winter Olympics.

References

1961 births
Living people
American male Nordic combined skiers
Olympic Nordic combined skiers of the United States
Nordic combined skiers at the 1988 Winter Olympics